EC Peiting is an ice hockey team in Peiting, Germany. They play in the Oberliga, the third level of ice hockey in Germany. The club was founded in 1968.

Achievements
Oberliga champion : 1974.

External links
Official site

Ice hockey teams in Germany
Ice hockey clubs established in 1968
Ice hockey teams in Bavaria
Weilheim-Schongau
1968 establishments in West Germany
Sport in Upper Bavaria